Loma Linda East is a census-designated place (CDP) in Jim Wells County, Texas, United States. The population was 254 at the 2010 census, up from 214 at the 2000 census.

Geography
Loma Linda East is located in west-central Jim Wells County at  (27.765671, -98.196317). Texas State Highways 44 and 359 form the southern border of the community. The co-routed highways lead west  to San Diego and east  to Alice, the Jim Wells county seat.

Demographics
As of the census of 2000, there were 214 people, 58 households, and 53 families residing in the CDP. The population density was 41.2 people per square mile (15.9/km2). There were 64 housing units at an average density of 12.3/sq mi (4.8/km2). The racial makeup of the CDP was 49.53% White, 0.47% Pacific Islander, 49.07% from other races, and 0.93% from two or more races. Hispanic or Latino of any race were 94.86% of the population.

There were 58 households, out of which 60.3% had children under the age of 18 living with them, 81.0% were married couples living together, 5.2% had a female householder with no husband present, and 8.6% were non-families. 6.9% of all households were made up of individuals, and 1.7% had someone living alone who was 65 years of age or older. The average household size was 3.69 and the average family size was 3.89.

In the CDP, the population was spread out, with 40.7% under the age of 18, 7.5% from 18 to 24, 32.7% from 25 to 44, 15.4% from 45 to 64, and 3.7% who were 65 years of age or older. The median age was 28 years. For every 100 females, there were 92.8 males. For every 100 females age 18 and over, there were 101.6 males.

The median income for a household in the CDP was $30,278, and the median income for a family was $30,278. Males had a median income of $21,250 versus $0 for females. The per capita income for the CDP was $6,614. About 46.4% of families and 69.2% of the population were below the poverty line, including 100.0% of those under the age of eighteen and none of those 65 or over.

Education
The western part of Loma Linda East is served by the San Diego Independent School District. The eastern part is in the Alice Independent School District. The former operates San Diego High School and the latter operates Alice High School.

References

Census-designated places in Jim Wells County, Texas
Census-designated places in Texas